Ferdinand Alexander "Ferry" Hoogendijk (23 November 1933 – 14 February 2014) was a Dutch journalist and politician.

Early life
Hoogendijk was born in Gouda. He studied political science at the University of Amsterdam, graduating in 1962. He earned a further doctorate in political science at the VU University Amsterdam. At the ceremony on 12 March 1971 his paranymphs were Norbert Schmelzer and Haya van Someren.

Career
The career of journalism of Hoogendijk started in 1960 at the Algemene Vereniging Radio Omroep, a Dutch public broadcaster. He was a political commentator for the association until 1981. Hoogendijk however achieved most of his fame with the magazine Elsevier. Hoogendijk joined the magazine in 1962 as political editor, by 1966 he joined the main editing staff of the magazine. In 1975 he became editor-in-chief and served in this position until 1985. During his time at Elsevier he became known as "Mr. Schnabbel", for having numerous jobs on the side. Amongst others he secretly wrote campaign texts for parliamentary leader Hans Wiegel of the People's Party for Freedom and Democracy. He also withheld information about an advisership to Gulf Oil. His resignation from Elsevier in 1985 was forced. Hoogendijk was also known as a staunch critic of the Den Uyl cabinet.

Politics
Hoogendijk was a member of the People's Party for Freedom and Democracy and served on the board of the youth section of the party in the 1950s. During the 1980s he was member of the party's Media commission for seven years. In 1982 he declined a position of State Secretary of Culture. Ed Nijpels nominated him for the position. Hoogendijk later said that he might have taken up the position, were it not that Ruud Lubbers blocked his nomination because Lubbers felt that he (Hoogendijk) had been too critical of him.

In 2002 he joined the Pim Fortuyn List and helped with the search for party candidates. He managed to make his neighbor Herman Heinsbroek join, who would later become Minister of Economic Affairs, the function that Hoogendijk ambitioned for. Hoogendijk was elected in the 2002 Dutch general election to the House of Representatives. He was involved in the party squabbles that led to the eventual downfall of the party. He lost his seat in the 2003 elections.

Hoogendijk was known as right-wing most of his life. However, in a 2013 interview he said he had become much more left wing and that capitalism has brought many good things but it has crossed a line.

Personal life
After his career as a journalist Hoogendijk was known as an art collector and trader. He founded and directed the arts magazine Art & Value after his retirement.

Hoogendijk was married twice, he had three daughters from his first marriage and one daughter from his second marriage. During his second marriage, over thirty years before his death, he was diagnosed with prostate cancer.

Hoogendijk was made Officer of the Order of Orange-Nassau.

References

External links
  Parlement.com biography

1933 births
2014 deaths
People from Gouda, South Holland
University of Amsterdam alumni
Vrije Universiteit Amsterdam alumni
Dutch auctioneers
Dutch art collectors
Dutch art historians
Dutch art dealers
Dutch republicans
Dutch political writers
Dutch political commentators
Dutch political journalists
Dutch publishers (people)
Dutch magazine editors
Deaths from prostate cancer
Deaths from cancer in the Netherlands
People's Party for Freedom and Democracy politicians
Pim Fortuyn List politicians
21st-century Dutch politicians
Members of the House of Representatives (Netherlands)
Officers of the Order of Orange-Nassau
Elsevier (magazine) editors